Attack Athletics is a  training center that includes four NBA regulation courts, and a 1,000-seat multi-purpose arena in Chicago, Illinois. It is owned by Tim Grover. The facility was designed by Cornerstone Architects Ltd. in Itasca, Illinois.

Attack Athletics serves as the off-season training facility to NBA players, including Dwyane Wade, Devin Harris, Gilbert Arenas, Will Bynum, Juwan Howard, Michael Finley, Jermaine O'Neal, and many others. Former Attack Athletics' clients include Michael Jordan, Scottie Pippen, Charles Barkley, and Hakeem Olajuwon.

The Attack Athletics facility was the home of the PBL's Chicago Throwbacks basketball team.  It was also the location where President Barack Obama played on Election Day.

References

American Basketball Association (2000–present) venues
Basketball in Chicago
Basketball venues in Illinois
Indoor arenas in Illinois
Sports venues in Chicago